The Community College of Vermont (CCV) is a public community college in Vermont. It is Vermont's second largest college, serving 7,000 students each semester and is part of the Vermont State Colleges System. The college has 12 locations throughout Vermont as well as extensive online learning options.

History
The state created the Vermont Regional Community College Commission (VRCCC) in 1970.  Peter Plympton Smith was hired as the first president. VRCCC opened in Montpelier with 10 courses and 50 students. In 1975, CCV earned accreditation from the New England Association of Schools and Colleges.

In 1992, CCV deployed the "virtual campus linking its 13 locations via a computer network. In 1996, CCV offered its first online course:  Introduction to Political Science.

In 1984, CCV's commencement topped 100 graduates and its twelfth site opened in Middlebury. In 1993, enrollment at CCV topped 5000 students.  In 2003, students aged 22 or younger reached 33% of all enrollment at CCV.  In 2004, enrollment at CCV topped 10,000 students. In the fall of 2010, CCV offered a new associate degree in Environmental Science.

In 2008, CCV purchased the building of the defunct Woodbury College in Montpelier.

In 2010 CCV built a new building in Winooski, replacing the former Burlington building.

In 2014, CCV moved its Brattleboro campus to the renovated Brooks House, in the downtown business district of the town.

Faculty unionization
In 2006 the American Federation of Teachers, which represents instructors at other colleges in the Vermont State Colleges system, organized a unionizing campaign.   The college opposed the unionization effort partially through a mailing effort, and the majority of the faculty voted not to unionize in September 2006.

A renewed unionization campaign was undertaken by the American Federation of Teachers in 2015. An election held in October, 2017 resulted in overwhelming faculty support for unionization with 69 percent of faculty voting in favor.

Locations
 Bennington, Vermont
 Brattleboro, Vermont
 Middlebury, Vermont
 Montpelier, Vermont
 Morrisville, Vermont
 Newport, Vermont
 Rutland, Vermont
 Springfield, Vermont
 St. Albans, Vermont
 St. Johnsbury, Vermont
 White River Junction, Vermont
 Winooski, Vermont

References

External links

 

Two-year colleges in the United States
Community colleges in Vermont
Organizations based in Vermont
Educational institutions established in 1970
Education in Addison County, Vermont
Education in Bennington County, Vermont
Education in Caledonia County, Vermont
Education in Franklin County, Vermont
Education in Lamoille County, Vermont
Education in Orleans County, Vermont
Education in Rutland County, Vermont
Education in Washington County, Vermont
Education in Windham County, Vermont
Education in Windsor County, Vermont
Bennington, Vermont
Brattleboro, Vermont
Education in Burlington, Vermont
Education in Montpelier, Vermont
Newport (city), Vermont
Springfield, Vermont
St. Johnsbury, Vermont
White River Junction, Vermont
St. Albans, Vermont
Rutland, Vermont
Middlebury, Vermont
1970 establishments in Vermont